Lady in a Fur Wrap is an oil painting now generally attributed to Alonso Sánchez Coello, dated to 1577-1579 and now held at the Pollok House in Glasgow.

Description
Against a dark background a young woman gazes at the viewer, dressed in a fur robe covering the rest of her dress. A fine transparent veil covers her head, and vaguely a necklace can be seen that she is wearing underneath it. The robe falls into darkness behind its fur lining, that may be ermine or lynx. The painting is unsigned but has traditionally been attributed to El Greco since it was in the Spanish gallery of French king Louis Philippe I and hung at the Louvre. It was purchased by Sir William Stirling-Maxwell at the king's estate sale of his Spanish Gallery in 1853. It was bequeathed to the city of Glasgow along with Pollok House by his heirs in 1966.

The painting's attribution has been brought into question and some, such as art historian Maria Kusche, have claimed it is by Sofonisba Anguissola. The sitter is also unknown, but considering the painting's royal provenance, the value of the fur and the jeweled necklace, various guesses have been made based on her widow's peak that it could be someone from Philip II's royal family.

Following an investigation by Museo del Prado, Glasgow Museums and The University of Glasgow the painting is no longer thought to be by El Greco, and generally attributed to Alonso Sánchez Coello.

In film
The 1947 dramatic film Lady in Ermine makes the painting the work of El Greco and the sitter, his (fictional) daughter Catalina.

See also
 Portrait of Infanta Isabella Clara Eugenia (Anguissola)

References

External links
 
 Catalog #346 La dama de armiño in 1908 El Greco catalog by Manuel B. Cossío (1858-1935)

1578 paintings
Paintings in Glasgow
Portraits of women
16th-century paintings